The Health and Social Care Select Committee (abbreviated to HSC, HSCC and HSCSC) is a Departmental Select Committee of the British House of Commons, the lower house of the United Kingdom Parliament. Its remit is to examine the policy, administration and expenditure of the Department of Health and Social Care (DHSC) and its associated agencies and public bodies. The Clerks of the Committee are Previn Desai and Joanna Dodd.

Inquiries
The Committee regularly initiates inquiries into government and the policies of DHSC's agencies and public bodies, such as NHS England. The Committees' power to hold an inquiry is a core function of a Departmental Select Committee.

2019 to present 

 Management of the Coronavirus Outbreak, opened 3 March 2020 (completed)
 Pre-appointment hearing for the role of Chair of NICE, opened 4 March 2020 (completed)
 Social care: funding and workforce, opened 10 March 2020 (completed)
 Delivering Core NHS and Care Services during the Pandemic and Beyond, opened 22 April 2020 (completed)
 Safety of maternity services in England, opened 24 July 2020 (completed)
 Workforce burnout and resilience in the NHS and social care, opened 30 July 2020 (ongoing)
 Coronavirus: lessons learnt, opened 6 October 2020 (ongoing), joint-inquiry with the Science and Technology Committee
  Coronavirus: recent developments, opened 7 January 2021 (ongoing)
  Children and young people's mental health, opened 29 January 2021 (ongoing)
  Treatment of autistic people and individuals with learning disabilities, opened 3 February 2021 (ongoing)
  Department's White Paper on health and social care, opened 25 February 2021 (ongoing)
Supporting those with dementia and their carers, opened 12 May 2021 (ongoing)
Cancer services, opened 6 July 2021 (ongoing)
General Practice Data for Planning and Research, opened 15 July 2021 (ongoing)
Clearing the backlog caused by the pandemic, opened 20 July 2021 (ongoing)
NHS litigation reform, opened 22 September 2021 (ongoing)
The future of General Practice, opened 15 November 2021 
Workforce: recruitment, training and retention in health and social care, opened 23 November 2021
The impact of body image on mental and physical health, opened 1 December 2021
Integrated Care Systems: autonomy and accountability, opened 6 July 2022
Independent Medicines and Medical Devices Safety (IMMDS) Review follow up one-off session, opened 1 September 2022

2017–2019 

 Alcohol minimum unit pricing
 Antimicrobial resistance inquiry
 Availability of Orkambi on the NHS
 Brexit – medicines, medical devices and substances of human origin
 Budget and NHS long-term plan
 Calls for cases of GP visa issues
 Care Quality Commission 
 Care Quality Commission's State of Care Report 2018-19
 Child and Adolescent Mental Health Services
 Childhood obesity
 Childhood obesity follow-up 2019
 Dentistry Services 
 Drugs policy
 Drugs policy: medicinal cannabis
 First 1000 days of life
 Government’s review of NHS overseas visitor charging
 Harding Review of health and social care workforce
 Impact of a no deal Brexit on health and social care 
 Impact of the Brexit withdrawal agreement on health and social care
 Improving air quality 
 Integrated care: organisations, partnerships and systems inquiry
 Kark Report 
 Long term funding of adult social care
 Long-term Sustainability of the NHS 
 Memorandum of understanding on data-sharing
 National Audit Office's Report on Investigation into pre-school vaccination 
 NHS Capital
 NHS funding 
 NHS Long-term Plan: legislative proposals
 NMC and Furness General Hospital
 Nursing workforce
 Patient safety and gross negligence manslaughter in healthcare 
 Pre-Appointment hearing for Chair of National Health Service Improvement
 Pre-Appointment hearing for Chair of NHS England
 Prison healthcare 
 Sexual health
 Suicide prevention: follow-up
 Transforming children and young people's mental health provision
 Work of NHS England and NHS Improvement
 Work of the Secretary of State for Health and Social Care

2015–2019 

 Appointment of Chair of Food Standards Agency hearing
 Brexit and health and social care
 Care Quality Commission accountability
 Childhood obesity
 Childhood obesity: follow-up 
 Children and young people's mental health - role of education inquiry
 Current issues in NHS England inquiry
 Department of Health and NHS finances inquiry
 Establishment and work of NHS Improvement inquiry
 Impact of membership of the EU on health policy in the UK 
 Impact of the Spending Review on health and social care
 Improving air quality
 Maternity services
 Meningitis B vaccine
 NHS England current issues
 Planning for winter pressure in accident and emergency departments
 Pre-appointment hearing for CQC Chair
 Pre-appointment hearing: Parliamentary and Health Service Ombudsman
 Primary care
 Professional Standards Authority
 Public health post-2013 - structures, organisation, funding and delivery
 Suicide prevention
 Sustainability and Transformation Plans
 Work of the Secretary of State for Health

2010–2015 

 2013 accountability hearing with Monitor
 2013 accountability hearing with the Care Quality Commission
 2013 accountability hearing with the General Medical Council
 2013 accountability hearing with the Nursing and Midwifery Council
 2014 accountability hearing with Monitor
 2014 accountability hearing with the Care Quality Commission
 2015 accountability hearing with the General Dental Council
 2015 accountability hearing with the General Medical Council
 2015 accountability hearing with the Nursing and Midwifery Council
 Accident and emergency services
 Accountability hearing with Monitor (2012)
 Accountability hearing with the Care Quality Commission (2012)
 Accountability hearing with the General Medical Council (2012)
 Accountability hearing with the Nursing and Midwifery Council (2012)
 Annual accountability hearing with Monitor
 Annual accountability hearing with the Care Quality Commission
 Annual accountability hearing with the General Medical Council
 Annual accountability hearing with the Nursing and Midwifery Council
 Care Quality Commission
 Children's and adolescent mental health and CAMHS
 Children's oral health 
 Commissioning
 Complaints and Litigation
 Complaints and raising concerns
 Ebola virus
 Education, training and workforce planning
 Emergency services and emergency care
 End of Life Care
 Follow-up inquiry into Commissioning
 Follow-up: Social Care inquiry
 Government's Alcohol Strategy
 Handling of NHS patient data
 Health and Care Professions Council
 Implementation of the Health and Social Care Act 2012
 Integrated Care Pioneers
 Management of long-term conditions
 National Institute for Health and Clinical Excellence (NICE)
 Nursing
 PPIP breast implants and regulation of cosmetic interventions
 Post-legislative scrutiny of the Mental Health Act 2007
 Pre-appointment hearing for Chair of NICE
 Pre-appointment hearing for Chair of the Care Quality Commission
 Pre-appointment hearing for Chair of the Food Standards Agency (FSA)
 Pre-appointment hearing for Chair of the NHS Commissioning Board
 Pre-appointment hearing for the Chair of Monitor
 Professional responsibility of Healthcare practitioners
 Professional Standards Authority work inquiry, Professional Standards Authority evidence
 Public Expenditure
 Public Expenditure 2
 Public expenditure on health and care services
 Public expenditure on health and social care
 Public expenditure on health and social care
 Public Health
 Public Health England
 Report of the Mid Staffordshire NHS Foundation Trust Public Inquiry
 Report of the NHS Future Forum
 Responsibilities of the Secretary of State for Health
 Revalidation of Doctors
 Social Care
 The impact of physical activity and diet on health
 Urgent and Emergency Care
 Work of NHS England
 Work of NICE

Membership

Current membership

Changes since 2019

2017-2019 Parliament
Sarah Wollaston was re-elected as Chair on 12 July 2017, with other members elected on 11 September 2017 as follows:

Changes 2017-2019

2015-2017 Parliament
The chair was elected on 18 June 2015, with members being announced on 8 July 2015.

Changes 2015-2017

2010-2015 Parliament
The chair was elected on 10 June 2010, with members being announced on 12 July 2010.

Changes 2010-2015

See also
Parliamentary Committees of the United Kingdom

References

External links
Records for the Health Committee are held at the Parliamentary Archives
UK Parliament, Health and Social Care Select Committee website
The committee at Twitter

Department of Health and Social Care
Select Committees of the British House of Commons
Parliamentary committees on Healthcare